Diamond Creek Township is a township in Chase County, Kansas, United States.  As of the 2000 census, its population was 237.

Geography
The streams of Collett Creek, Diamond Creek, Gannon Creek, Middle Creek, Mulvane Creek, Pickett Creek, Schaffer Creek, School Creek, Stribby Creek and Wildcat Creek run through this township.

Communities
The township contains the following settlements:
 City of Elmdale.
 Unincorporated community of Hymer.
 Ghost town of Elk (east part of community).

Cemeteries
The township contains the following cemeteries:
 Boenitz.
 Diamond Creek.
 Elmdale.

Further reading

References

External links
 Chase County Website
 City-Data.com
 Chase County Maps: Current, Historic, KDOT

Townships in Chase County, Kansas
Townships in Kansas